Badowski may refer to:

 Henry Badowski (born 1958), a British musician
 Kazimierz Badowski (190?-1990), a Polish communist activist